The women's 100m freestyle S12 event at the 2012 Summer Paralympics took place at the  London Aquatics Centre on 4 September. There were three heats; the swimmers with the eight fastest times advanced to the final.

Results

Heats
Competed from 11:24.

Heat 1

Heat 2

Heat 3

Final
Competed at 19:42.

 
'Q = qualified for final. WR = World Record.  DNS = Did not start.

References
Official London 2012 Paralympics Results: Heats 
Official London 2012 Paralympics Results: Final 

Swimming at the 2012 Summer Paralympics
2012 in women's swimming